Macranthera is a genus of flowering plants belonging to the family Orobanchaceae.

Its native range is the Southeastern USA.

Species
Species:
 Macranthera flammea (W.Bartram) Pennell

References

Orobanchaceae
Orobanchaceae genera